River of Souls is the twelfth album by American singer-songwriter Dan Fogelberg, released in September 1993. The album features a variety of genres ranging from Celtic, Brazilian, country, and African soft rock. It received mostly positive reviews from fans and critics alike, praising the instrumentation and vocals. However, some of the song's topics, which included war and politics, were not well received.

Track listing
All songs written by Dan Fogelberg.

"Magic Every Moment" – 4:22
"All There Is" – 4:34
"The Minstrel" – 4:42
"Faces of America" – 6:09
"Holy Road" – 6:01
"Serengeti Moon" – 4:45
"Higher Ground" – 5:50
"A Love Like This" – 3:57
"River of Souls" – 6:11
"A Voice for Peace" – 5:51

Personnel 
 Dan Fogelberg – vocals, keyboards (1, 3, 6, 7, 10), acoustic guitar (1, 2, 4, 5), bass guitar (1, 3–7), synth steel drum (1), horn arrangements (1, 5), electric guitar (2, 4, 8), percussion (2, 3, 4, 6, 7, 9, 10), acoustic piano (3, 5, 6, 8, 10), Hammond B3 organ (4), mandolin (4), drum programming (4–8, 10), cymbal (5, 9), cowbell (5), sampling (7), lead guitar (8, 10), classical guitar (9), synth flute (9), synth strings (9), rhythm guitar (10)
 Vince Melamed – synth marimba (1)
 Michael Hanna – keyboards (2)
 Mike Finnigan – Hammond B3 organ (5, 10)
 Bill Payne – acoustic piano (9)
 Robert McEntree – electric guitar (7, 8)
 Larry Klein – fretless bass (2), bass guitar (9)
 Mike Porcaro – bass guitar (2)
 Bob Glaub – bass guitar (8, 10)
 Mike Botts – drums (1), shaker (1), bass drum (3), hi-hat (3), cymbal (8, 10)
 Russ Kunkel – drums (2, 4), cymbal (3, 6, 7)
 Carlos Vega – drums (7)
 Lenny Castro – congas (1, 5), shaker (1), timbales (5)
 Alex Acuña – congas (2, 9), udu (2, 9, shaker (9), triangle (9), woodblock (9)
 Pam Boulding – hammered dulcimer (3)
 Bill Bergman – saxophone (1, 5), horn arrangements (1, 5)
 Stephen "Doc" Kupka – baritone saxophone (1, 5)
 Dennis Farias – trumpet (1, 5)
 Daniel Fornero – trumpet (1, 5)
 Philip Boulding – pennywhistle (3), Celtic harp (3)
 Gene Elders – fiddle (4)
 David Campbell – orchestra arrangements (3), conductor (3, 8), string arrangements (8)
 Julia Tillman Waters – backing vocals (5, 7)
 Oren Waters – backing vocals (5, 6, 7)
 Maxine Willard Waters – backing vocals (5, 6, 7)
 Maxine Anderson – backing vocals (6)
 Ronald Kunene – backing vocals (6)
 Abner Mariri – backing vocals (6)
 Lebohang Morake – backing vocals (6)
 Josef Powell – backing vocals (6)

Production 
 Producer – Dan Fogelberg
 Executive Producer – Remington Buckaroo Boone
 Engineers – Dan Fogelberg, Marty Lewis, Dave Reynolds, Elliot Scheiner and James Tuttle.
 Assistant Engineers – Neal Avron, Anastasia Fogelberg, Dave Glover, Mike Kloster and Kevin Nimmo.
 Recorded at Mountain Bird Studios (Boulder, CO) and Sunset Sound (Los Angeles, CA).
 Mixed by Elliot Scheiner at The Village Recorder (Los Angeles, CA).
 Mix Assistant – Tom Winslow
 Mastered by Denny Purcell at Georgetown Masters (Nashville, TN).
 Art Direction and Design – John Kosh and Brian Wittman
 Photography – Henry Diltz

Charts

References

Dan Fogelberg albums
1993 albums
Albums arranged by David Campbell (composer)